The Malaysian League or also known as the M-League (Malay: Liga Malaysia or Liga-M) is a terminology used to describe the professional association football league in Malaysia. The terminology was mainly used to describe the league and its divisions associated within the Malaysian football league system.

History

Origin 

The concept of an annual competition between the states in Malaysia goes back more than 100 years. In 1967, the Malaya Cup (Malay: Piala Malaya) was renamed as the Malaysia Cup (Malay: Piala Malaysia) but essentially the amateur ethos continued until the foundations of a  nationwide Malaysian football league was introduced by the Football Association of Malaysia (FAM) in 1979 as a "halfway house" towards full professional status through a revamp of the format for the Malaysia Cup.

Era of Liga Malaysia (1979–1989) 

A Malaysian football league competition involving the representative sides of the state football associations was first held in Malaysia in 1979. When it began, it was intended primarily as a qualifying tournament for the knockout stages of the Malaysia Cup where teams competed in a one-round league before advancing to the knockout stages. The top four teams at the end of the league will face off in two semi-finals before the winners advance to the finals. In 1981, the quarter-finals stage were introduced where eight teams qualified from the preliminary stage.

However, it was not until 1982 that a league trophy was introduced for Liga Malaysia to recognise the winners of the preliminary stage as the league champions which then officially started the era of a nationwide football league in Malaysia at an amateur level. Since then, the Malaysia Cup has been held after the conclusion of the league each year, with only the best-performing teams in the league qualifying for the tournament. Over the years, the league competition gained important stature in its own right.

Era of Liga Semi-Pro (1989–1993) 

In the early days, the Malaysian football league system consisted of a single division amateur league before changes were made in 1989 when it was fully known as Liga Semi-Pro from 1989 to 1993. The league was divided into two divisions, Liga Semi-Pro Divisyen 1 and Liga Semi-Pro Divisyen 2.

The inaugural season of the Liga Semi-Pro consisted of nine teams in Divisyen 1 and eight teams in Divisyen 2. The Royal Malaysian Police joined Divisyen 2 in 1990. Games were played on a home and away basis for about four months roughly between the end of April or early May and the end of August or early September.

Early era of Liga Perdana (1994–1997) 

Liga Perdana was formed and established in 1994 to succeed the Liga Semi-Pro and became Malaysia's first fully professional football league and was the top-tier football league in the country at that time. At this time the league was interchangeably referred as the Malaysian League or M-League.

Era of Liga Perdana 1 and Liga Perdana 2 (1998–2003) 

In 1998, Liga Perdana was divided into two divisions, consisting of Liga Perdana 1 and Liga Perdana 2. During this time both divisions were just referred to as the Malaysian League as a whole.

In the 1998 season, Liga Perdana 1 consisted of 12 teams while Liga Perdana 2 had 8 teams. 10 teams that previously qualified for the Malaysia Cup that also competed in the 1997 Liga Perdana were automatically qualified to for that season's Liga Perdana 1. The other two spots were filled by a playoff round of the 5 lowest teams in the 1997 Liga Perdana and the Malaysian Olympic football team, Olympic 2000. The lowest four teams from the playoff round were then put into Liga Perdana 2 alongside the Police, the Malaysian Armed Forces, Negeri Sembilan Chempaka F.C and PKN Johor. At this time, the league still consisted of semi-professional teams where each team was allowed to register 25 players where 12 players must be a professional for Liga Perdana 1 and a minimum of six professional players in Liga Perdana 2.

Both leagues continued until 2003 when the Football Association of Malaysia (FAM) decided to privatise the league from the 2004 season onwards when the Malaysia Super League was formed. Teams in Liga Perdana 1 and Liga Perdana 2 were put through a qualification stage and playoffs to be promoted into the brand new Malaysia Super League. Teams that failed to progress in the qualifications were put into the new second-tier league, the Malaysia Premier League.

Era of Malaysia Super League and Malaysia Premier League (2004 onwards) 

After 2004, the Malaysian League term is mainly used to describe the top-two divisions in the Malaysian football league system as a whole rather than just the top-tier division in the country.

Logo history 
There have been multiple different iterations of the Malaysian League logo. The first logo was used during the era of Dunhill sponsorship. The new logo which replaced it was when Telekom Malaysia sponsored the league in 2005. The last logo used was in 2011 when Astro Media first sponsored the Malaysian League. From 2012, no logo was created for the league as the Malaysia Super League and the Malaysia Premier League had its own logos.

Current league system 

Unlike most countries that plays its football with separate systems, the league system in Malaysia consists of professional clubs that compete at the top levels, to representative teams from state or district associations, university sides, city councils and clubs from companies, ministries or government agencies.

Malaysia Super League 

The Malaysia Super League (Malay: Liga Super Malaysia) is a Malaysian professional association football league. It is the top flight of the Malaysian football league system and is managed by the Malaysian Football League (MFL) and in partnership with the Football Association of Malaysia (FAM). The league is contested between 12 teams and operates on a system of promotion and relegation with the Malaysia Premier League. The 12 clubs participating in the top flight league need to pass a set of requirements and a verification process, particularly related to professionalism and infrastructure feasibility.

Malaysia Premier League 

The Malaysia Premier League (Malay: Liga Premier Malaysia) is the second-tier football league in the Malaysian football league system and it is also managed by the Malaysian Football League (MFL) and in partnership with the Football Association of Malaysia (FAM). The league is contested between 12 teams and operates on a system of promotion and relegation with the Malaysia Super League and the Malaysia M3 League. The 12 clubs participating in this league need to pass a set of requirements and a verification process, particularly related to professionalism and infrastructure feasibility although with a lower requirement compared to the Malaysia Super League.

Former competitions

Malaysia FAM League/Cup 

The Malaysia FAM League or Malaysia FAM Cup (Malay: Liga FAM or Piala FAM) was the third-tier football league in Malaysia. The tournament used to be a cup format, but was changed 2008 as it was held as a league tournament and changing to the Malaysia FAM League name. Malaysia FAM Cup was established in 1952 as a secondary knockout competition to the more prestigious Malaya Cup, the competition was held between the state teams including Singapore, the Police, the Army, and the Prisons Department of Malaysia in its early days. Starting in 1974, the state teams were barred from entering the competition and only the club sides were allowed to enter.

Liga Bolasepak Rakyat 

The Liga Bolasepak Rakyat was the fourth-tier football league in Malaysia. The league was managed by the Liga Bolasepak Rakyat-Limited Liability Partnership (LBR-LLP) and was an amateur-level competition which was established in 2015 which aimed to create a bigger base at grassroots level and eventually provide an alternative route for footballers under the age of 28 to make the grade. In its inaugural season, a total of 111 clubs out of more than 150 possible districts in the country competed in the league. The clubs were divided into 8 zones.

Development and youth competition

Piala Presiden 

The Piala Presiden is a developmental football competition in Malaysia for Under-21 players. Since its inception in 1985, the Piala Presiden has been the major tournament for Under-21 and Under-23 players. In 2009, the format of the competition was changed to allow only Under-20 players being eligible to be fielded for the tournament. In 2015, the format of the competition was reverted to the original format with Under-21 players and three overaged players eligible to play.

Piala Belia 

The Piala Belia is a youth football competition in Malaysia for Under-19 players. Since its inception in 2008, the Piala Belia has been the major tournament for Under-19s. In 2009 to 2011, the competition was combined with the Piala Presiden. In 2015, the format of the competition was changed to a league format.

Records

Hall of Fame

League championship

See also 
 Liga Malaysia (1982–1988)
 Liga Semi-Pro
 Liga Semi-Pro Divisyen 1
 Liga Semi-Pro Divisyen 2
 Liga Perdana
 Liga Perdana 1
 Liga Perdana 2
 Malaysia Super League
 Malaysia Premier League
 Malaysia FAM League
 Malaysia Cup
 Malaysia FA Cup

External links 
 
 RSSSF.com: Malaysia - List of Champions

References 

History of football in Malaysia